Antonina Shevchenko (born ) is a Kyrgyzstani and Peruvian Muay Thai fighter and mixed martial artist currently competing in the flyweight division of the UFC. She is the older sister of fellow UFC fighter and former UFC Flyweight champion Valentina Shevchenko.

Muay Thai and kickboxing
Between 2003 and 2017 Antonina Shevchenko participated in 40 professional kickboxing and muay thai fights, winning 39 and losing only one, to Yulia Voskoboynik. She won 4 gold medals and a single bronze and silver medal at the IFMA world championships, as well as a silver medal at the IFMA Royal World Cup. She is also the former WKC K1 and Muay Thai Champion, the former Phoenix FC Muay Thai Champion, and the former Lion Fight Muay Thai Champion with two title defenses.

Mixed martial arts career

Early career
Antonina Shevchenko made her MMA debut in 2002 and compiled a 3–0 record before taking a twelve-year hiatus from the sport. In 2017, she returned to MMA, building her record to 7–1.

Dana White's Tuesday Night Contender Series
Shevchenko next competed on the second season of Dana White's Tuesday Night Contender Series, where fighters compete for the chance of being awarded a contract with the UFC. She was scheduled to face Silvana Juarez at Dana White's Tuesday Night Contender Series 11 on June 26, 2018, however, 8 days before the fight it was announced that Juarez was forced out of the bout with an undisclosed injury. As a result, she was replaced by Jaimelene Nievera. Shevchenko won the fight via TKO in the second round after delivering multiple unanswered knees from the clinch. Her win earned her a contract with the UFC.

Ultimate Fighting Championship
Shevchenko was expected to make her promotional debut against Ashlee Evans-Smith on November 30, 2018, at The Ultimate Fighter 28 Finale. However, it was reported on 8 November 2018 that Evans-Smith pulled out of the event due to injury and she was replaced by Ji Yeon Kim. At the weigh-ins, Ji Yeon Kim weighed in at 130.5 pounds, 4.5 pounds over the flyweight non-title fight limit of 126. She was fined 20 percent of her  purse, which went to her opponent Shevchenko. The bout proceeded at catchweight. She won the fight via unanimous decision.

Shevchenko faced Roxanne Modafferi on April 20, 2019, at UFC on ESPN+ 7. She lost the fight via split decision.

Shevchenko faced Lucie Pudilová on August 3, 2019, at UFC on ESPN 5. She won the fight via technical submission due to a rear-naked choke in the second round. The win also earned  her the Fight of the Night bonus award.

Shevchenko was scheduled to face Cynthia Calvillo on April 25, 2020. However, on April 9, Dana White, the president of UFC announced that this event was postponed to a future date Instead, Shevchenko faced Katlyn Chookagian on May 30, 2020, at UFC on ESPN: Woodley vs. Burns. She lost the fight by unanimous decision after being dominated for 3 rounds.

Shevchenko faced Ariane Lipski on November 21, 2020, at UFC 255. She won the fight via technical knockout. This win earned her the Performance of the Night award.

Shevchenko faced Andrea Lee on May 15, 2021, at UFC 262. She lost the bout via triangle armbar at the end of the second round.

Shevchenko faced Casey O'Neill on October 2, 2021, at UFC Fight Night: Santos vs. Walker. She lost the fight via technical knockout in round two.

Shevchenko was scheduled to face Cortney Casey on April 30, 2022, at UFC on ESPN 35. However, the bout was postponed to July 9, 2022, at UFC on ESPN 39, as Shevchenko injured her knee in training . Shevchenko won the fight via split decision.

Championships and accomplishments

Muay Thai
 2017 WMC Muaythai Female Super Lightweight World Champion
 2017 Phoenix Fighting Championship Muay Thai World Champion.
Lion Fight Lightweight Muay Thai World Championship
Two successful title defenses
2016 Gold medal - IFMA Amateur Muay Thai World Championships (63.5 kg)
2014 Gold medal - IFMA Amateur Muay Thai World Championships (63.5 kg)
2014 W.K.C. Muay Thai World Champion (63.5 kg)
2013 W.K.C. K1 World Champion (63.5 kg)
2011 Gold medal - IFMA Amateur Muay Thai World Championships (63.5 kg)
2008 Bronze medal - IFMA Amateur Muay Thai World Championships (60 kg)
2008 Gold medal - RMF Amateur Muay Thai Russian National Championships (60 kg)
2007 Silver medal - IFMA Amateur Muay Thai World Championships (60 kg)
2007 Gold medal - RMF Amateur Muay Thai Russian National Championships (60 kg)
2003 Gold medal - IFMA Amateur Muay Thai World Championships (60 kg)

Taekwondo
2005 ITF and WTF European Championship, Gold Medal (63 kg)
2005 ITF and WTF European Championship Team Pattern, Gold Medal
2003 ITF World Championship, Silver Medal (63 kg)
2002 ITF Asian Championship, Gold Medal (58 kg)
1998 ITF World Championship, Bronze Medal (58 kg)

Mixed Martial Arts
Ultimate Fighting Championship
Fight of the Night (One time) 
Performance of the Night (One time)

Personal life 
Shevchenko is married to her coach Pavel Fedotov. Shevchenko's family is of Ukrainian origin. She's the older sister of fellow MMA fighter and former UFC Flyweight champion Valentina Shevchenko. Antonina and Valentina made UFC history by becoming the first pair of sisters to fight on the same card at UFC 255. Outside of fighting, Shevchenko is also a licensed commercial pilot.

Mixed martial arts record

|-
|Win
|align=center|10–4
|Cortney Casey
|Decision (split)
|UFC on ESPN: dos Anjos vs. Fiziev
|
|align=center|3
|align=center|5:00
|Las Vegas, Nevada, United States
|
|-
|Loss
|align=center|9–4
|Casey O'Neill
|TKO (punches)
|UFC Fight Night: Santos vs. Walker 
|
|align=center|2
|align=center|4:47
|Las Vegas, Nevada, United States
|
|-
|Loss
|align=center|9–3
|Andrea Lee
|Submission (triangle armbar)
|UFC 262 
|
|align=center|2
|align=center|4:52
|Houston, Texas, United States
|  
|-
|Win
|align=center|9–2
|Ariane Lipski
|TKO (punches)
|UFC 255
|
|align=center|2
|align=center|4:33
|Las Vegas, Nevada, United States
|
|-
|Loss
|align=center|8–2
|Katlyn Chookagian
|Decision (unanimous)
|UFC on ESPN: Woodley vs. Burns
|
|align=center|3
|align=center|5:00
|Las Vegas, Nevada, United States
|
|-
|Win
|align=center|8–1
|Lucie Pudilová
|Technical Submission (rear-naked choke)
|UFC on ESPN: Covington vs. Lawler
|
|align=center|2
|align=center|1:20
|Newark, New Jersey, United States
|
|-
|Loss
|align=center|7–1
|Roxanne Modafferi
|Decision (split)
|UFC Fight Night: Overeem vs. Oleinik
|
|align=center|3
|align=center|5:00
|Saint Petersburg, Russia
|
|-
|Win
|align=center|7–0
|Ji Yeon Kim
|Decision (unanimous)
|The Ultimate Fighter: Heavy Hitters Finale
|
|align=center|3
|align=center|5:00
|Las Vegas, Nevada, United States
|
|-
|Win
|align=center|6–0
|Jaymee Nievara
|TKO (knees)
|Dana White's Tuesday Night Contender Series 2
|
|align=center|2
|align=center|3:22
|Las Vegas, Nevada, United States
|
|-
|Win
|align=center|5–0
|Valérie Domergue
|Decision (unanimous)
|Phoenix FC 4: Dubai
|
|align=center|3
|align=center|5:00
|Dubai, United Arab Emirates
|
|-
|Win
|align=center|4–0
|Anissa Haddaoui
|Decision (unanimous)
|Phoenix FC 3: UK vs. The World
|
|align=center|3
|align=center|5:00
|London, England
|
|-
|Win
|align=center|3–0
|Hyun Seong Kim
|Decision (unanimous)
|WXF: X-Impact World Championships 2005
|
|align=center|3
|align=center|5:00
|Seoul, South Korea
|
|-
|Win
|align=center|2–0
|Hyun Seong Kim
|Decision (unanimous)
|WXF: X-Impact World Championships 2003
|
|align=center|3
|align=center|2:00
|Seoul, South Korea
|
|-
|Win
|align=center|1–0
|Anara Bayanova
|TKO (punches)
|KFK: Cup of Kyrgyzstan
|
|align=center|2
|align=center|N/A
|Bishkek, Kyrgyzstan
|

Professional Kickboxing and Muay Thai record (Incomplete)

|- style="background:#cfc;"
|
| style="text-align:center;" |Win
| Isa Tidblad Keskikangas
|Phoenix Fighting Championships
| Zouk Mosbeh, Lebanon
| style="text-align:center;" |Decision
| align="center" |5
| align="center" |3:00
| style="text-align:center;" |N/A
|-
! style=background:white colspan=9 |
|- style="background:#cfc;"
|
| style="text-align:center;" |Win
| Ilona Wijmans
|Lion Fight 33
| Mashantucket, Connecticut, United States
| style="text-align:center;" |Decision (Unanimous)
| align="center" |5
| align="center" |3:00
| style="text-align:center;" |N/A
|-
! style=background:white colspan=9 |
|- style="background:#cfc;"
|
| style="text-align:center;" |Win
| Paola Cappucci
|Lion Fight 31
| Mashantucket, Connecticut, United States
| style="text-align:center;" |Decision (Unanimous)
| align="center" |5
| align="center" |3:00
| style="text-align:center;" |N/A
|-
! style=background:white colspan=9 |
|- style="background:#cfc;"
|
| style="text-align:center;" |Win
| Laetitia Bakissy
|Enfusion Live Season 6
| Koh Samui, Thailand
| style="text-align:center;" |Decision (Unanimous)
| align="center" |N/A
| align="center" |3:00
| style="text-align:center;" |N/A
|-
! style=background:white colspan=9 |
|- style="background:#cfc;"
|
| style="text-align:center;" |Win
| Shana Lammers
|Enfusion Live Season 6
| Koh Samui, Thailand
| style="text-align:center;" |TKO
| align="center" |3
| align="center" |N/A
| style="text-align:center;" |N/A
|-
! style=background:white colspan=9 |
|- style="background:#cfc;"
|
| style="text-align:center;" |Win
| Yajaira Manzanares
|WKC K-1 World Championships 2014
| Lima, Peru
| style="text-align:center;" |Decision
| align="center" |5
| align="center" |3:00
| style="text-align:center;" |N/A
|-
! style=background:white colspan=9 |
|- style="background:#cfc;"
|
| style="text-align:center;" |Win
| Zoe Rodriguez
|WKC K-1 World Championships 2013
| Mexico
| style="text-align:center;" |KO (Punches)
| align="center" |1
| align="center" |N/A
| style="text-align:center;" |N/A
|-
! style=background:white colspan=9 |
|- style="background:#cfc;"
|
| style="text-align:center;" |Win
| Paola Bernachea
|K-1 event in Peru
| Lima, Peru
| style="text-align:center;" |Decision (Unanimous)
| align="center" |4
| align="center" |2:00
| style="text-align:center;" |N/A
|-
|- style="background:#cfc;"
|
| style="text-align:center;" |Win
| Andrea Salazar
|Muay Thai event in Argentina
| Buenos Aires, Argentina
| style="text-align:center;" |Decision (Unanimous)
| align="center" |N/A
| align="center" |N/A
| style="text-align:center;" |N/A
|-
|- style="background:#cfc;"
|
| style="text-align:center;" |Win
| Caroline Rodriguez
|MAF
| Lima, Peru
| style="text-align:center;" |Decision (Unanimous)
| align="center" |4
| align="center" |2:00
| style="text-align:center;" |N/A
|-
|- style="background:#cfc;"
|
| style="text-align:center;" |Win
| Chantal Ughi
|Muay Thai event in Thailand
| Koh Samui, Thailand
| style="text-align:center;" |Decision (Unanimous)
| align="center" |4
| align="center" |2:00
| style="text-align:center;" |N/A
|-
|- style="background:#cfc;"
|
| style="text-align:center;" |Win
| Kwanta Soonkeeranakornsree
|Andaman Coast Muay Thai Championship
| Phuket, Thailand
| style="text-align:center;" |TKO (Body kick and punch)
| align="center" |3
| align="center" |1:40
| style="text-align:center;" |N/A
|-
|- style="background:#cfc;"
|
| style="text-align:center;" |Win
| Heilyn Rios
|K-1 event in Peru
| Lima, Peru
| style="text-align:center;" |TKO
| align="center" |1
| align="center" |N/A
| style="text-align:center;" |N/A
|-
|- style="background:#cfc;"
|
| style="text-align:center;" |Win
| Lyubov Lopatina
|Muay Thai event in Russia
| Krasnodar, Russia
| style="text-align:center;" |Decision (Unanimous)
| align="center" |N/A
| align="center" |N/A
| style="text-align:center;" |N/A
|-
|- style="background:#fbb;"
|
| style="text-align:center;" |Loss
| Yulia Voskoboynik
|Kickboxing event in Oman
| Muscat, Oman
| style="text-align:center;" |Decision
| align="center" |N/A
| align="center" |N/A
| style="text-align:center;" |N/A
|-
|- style="background:#cfc;"
|
| style="text-align:center;" |Win
| Elvira Tashim
|Kickboxing event in Kyrgyzstan
| Bishkek, Kyrgyzstan
| style="text-align:center;" |TKO (Axe kick)
| align="center" |2
| align="center" |N/A
| style="text-align:center;" |N/A
|-

|-  style="background:#cfc;"
| 2016-05-28 || Win ||align=left| Svetlana Vinnikova || I.F.M.A. World Championship Tournament 2016, Finals -63.5 kg || Jönköping, Sweden || Decision || N/A || N/A
|-
! style=background:white colspan=9 |
|-  style="background:#cfc;"
| 2016-05-26 || Win ||align=left| Kybra Akbulut || I.F.M.A. World Championship Tournament 2016, Semi-finals -63.5 kg || Jönköping, Sweden || Decision || 3 || N/A
|-  style="background:#cfc;"
| 2016-05-24 || Win ||align=left| Oumayma Belashib || I.F.M.A. World Championship Tournament 2016, Quarter Finals -63.5 kg || Jönköping, Sweden || Decision || 3 || N/A
|-  style="background:#cfc;"
| 2015-08-20 || Win ||align=left| Svetlana Vinnikova || I.F.M.A. Royal Cup 2015, Semi Finals -63.5 kg || Bangkok, Thailand || Decision (Unanimous) || 3 || 3:00
|-
|-  style="background:#cfc;"
| 2015-08-17 || Win ||align=left| Soukaina Naili || I.F.M.A. Royal Cup 2015, Quarter Finals -63.5 kg || Bangkok, Thailand || Decision (Unanimous) || 3 || 3:00
|-
|-  style="background:#cfc;"
| 2014-05-? || Win ||align=left| Melissa Anderson || I.F.M.A. World Championship Tournament 2014, Finals -63.5 kg || Langkawi, Malaysia || Decision (Unanimous) || N/A || N/A
|-
! style=background:white colspan=9 |
|-  style="background:#cfc;"
| 2014-05-? || Win ||align=left| Riikka Järvenpää || I.F.M.A. World Championship Tournament 2014, Semi Finals -63.5 kg || Langkawi, Malaysia || Decision (Unanimous) || N/A || N/A
|-
|-  style="background:#cfc;"
| 2014-05-? || Win ||align=left| Jennifer Guerrero || I.F.M.A. World Championship Tournament 2014, Quarter Finals -63.5 kg || Langkawi, Malaysia || Decision (Unanimous) || N/A || N/A
|-
|-  style="background:#cfc;"
| 2011-09-26 || Win ||align=left| Lina Länsberg || I.F.M.A. World Championship Tournament 2011, Finals -63.5 kg || Tashkent, Uzbekistan || Decision (Unanimous) || N/A || N/A
|-
! style=background:white colspan=9 |
|-  style="background:#cfc;"
| 2011-09-24 || Win ||align=left| Svetlana Usmanova || I.F.M.A. World Championship Tournament 2011, Semi Finals -63.5 kg || Tashkent, Uzbekistan || Decision (Unanimous) || N/A || N/A
|-
|-  style="background:#cfc;"
| 2011-09-22 || Win ||align=left| Rachida Hilali || I.F.M.A. World Championship Tournament 2011, Quarter Finals -63.5 kg || Tashkent, Uzbekistan || Decision (Unanimous) || N/A || N/A
|-
|-  style="background:#fbb;"
| 2010-08-?|| Loss ||align=left| Alla Ivashkevich || I.F.M.A. World Championship Tournament 2010, Quarter Finals -60 kg || Bangkok, Thailand || Decision || 3 || 3:00
|-
|-  style="background:#cfc;"
| 2010-08-?|| Win ||align=left| N/A || I.F.M.A. World Championship Tournament 2010, Eight Finals -60 kg || Bangkok, Thailand || N/A || N/A || N/A
|-
|-  style="background:#fbb;"
| 2008-09-?|| Loss ||align=left| N/A || I.F.M.A. World Championship Tournament 2008, Semi Finals -60 kg || Busan, South Korea || N/A || N/A || N/A
|-
! style=background:white colspan=9 |
|-  style="background:#cfc;"
| 2008-09-?|| Win ||align=left| Alena Muratova || I.F.M.A. World Championship Tournament 2008, Quarter Finals -60 kg || Busan, South Korea || Decision (Unanimous) || 3 || 3:00
|-
|-  style="background:#cfc;"
| 2008-09-?|| Win ||align=left| N/A || I.F.M.A. World Championship Tournament 2008, First Round -60 kg || Busan, South Korea || TKO || N/A || N/A
|-
|-  style="background:#fbb;"
| 2007-12-4|| Loss ||align=left| Lamduan Satkum || I.F.M.A. World Championship Tournament 2007, Finals -60 kg || Bangkok, Thailand || Decision || 4 || 2:00
|-
! style=background:white colspan=9 |
|-  style="background:#cfc;"
| 2007-11-30|| Win ||align=left| Katarina Perkkiö || I.F.M.A. World Championship Tournament 2007, Semi Finals -60 kg || Bangkok, Thailand || Decision (Unanimous) || 4 || 2:00
|-
|-  style="background:#cfc;"
| 2007-11-?|| Win ||align=left| N/A || I.F.M.A. World Championship Tournament 2007, Quarter Finals -60 kg || Bangkok, Thailand || KO || 1 || N/A
|-
|-  style="background:#cfc;"
| 2007-?-?|| Win ||align=left| N/A || R.M.F. Russian National Championship Tournament 2007, Finals -60 kg || Yekaterinburg, Russia || Decision || 3 || N/A
|-
! style=background:white colspan=9 |
|-  style="background:#cfc;"
|-  style="background:#cfc;"
| 2007-?-?|| Win ||align=left| Alla Ivashkevich || I.F.M.A. Cup of Russia || Sochi, Russia || Decision (Unanimous) || N/A || N/A
|-
|-  style="background:#cfc;"
| 2003-10-13|| Win ||align=left| Katarina Perkkiö || WAKO World Championships || Paris, France || Decision (Unanimous) || 3 || 2:00
|-
|-  style="background:#cfc;"
| 2003-09-?|| Win ||align=left| Suzanne Miller || I.F.M.A. World Championship Tournament 2003, Finals -60 kg || Almaty, Kazakhstan || Decision (Unanimous) || 3 || 3:00
|-
! style=background:white colspan=9 |
|-  style="background:#cfc;"
| 2003-09-?|| Win ||align=left| N/A || I.F.M.A. World Championship Tournament 2003, Semi Finals -60 kg || Almaty, Kazakhstan || N/A || N/A || N/A
|- 
|-  style="background:#cfc;"
| 2003-09-?|| Win ||align=left| N/A || I.F.M.A. World Championship Tournament 2003, Quarter Finals -60 kg || Almaty, Kazakhstan || N/A || N/A || N/A
|-                
| colspan=9 | Legend:

References

External links
 

1984 births
Living people
Sportspeople from Bishkek
Female Muay Thai practitioners
Bantamweight mixed martial artists
Lightweight kickboxers
Kyrgyzstani people of Ukrainian descent
Kyrgyzstani emigrants to Peru
Kyrgyzstani female kickboxers
Kyrgyzstani female taekwondo practitioners
Kyrgyzstani female mixed martial artists
Kyrgyzstani Muay Thai practitioners
Naturalized citizens of Peru
Peruvian people of Ukrainian descent
Peruvian female kickboxers
Peruvian female taekwondo practitioners
Peruvian Muay Thai practitioners
Peruvian female mixed martial artists
Flyweight mixed martial artists
Kyrgyzstani expatriates in the United States
Peruvian expatriates in the United States
Mixed martial artists utilizing Muay Thai
Ultimate Fighting Championship female fighters